Mouhamed Menaour Belkheir (born 2 January 1999) is a French professional footballer who plays as a forward for Portuguese club Vilafranquense.

Career
In 2018, Belkheir signed for Brescia Calcio in the Italian second division from Inter Milan, one of Italy's most successful clubs, where he suffered injuries during his last season there. 

In 2019, he was sent on loan to A.D. Sanjoanense in the Portuguese third division.

In 2020, Belkheir signed for Leixões S.C. in the Portuguese second division.

References

External links
 
 

French footballers
Living people
Association football forwards
1999 births
French sportspeople of Algerian descent
A.D. Sanjoanense players
Leixões S.C. players
Torino F.C. players
Brescia Calcio players
U.D. Vilafranquense players
Campeonato de Portugal (league) players
Liga Portugal 2 players
French expatriate footballers
Expatriate footballers in Italy
Expatriate footballers in Portugal
French expatriate sportspeople in Italy
French expatriate sportspeople in Portugal